Jaime Huerta (born August 8, 1987)  is a Peruvian footballer who plays as a defender. He currently plays for EM Binacional.

Huerta played for Peru at the 2007 South American Youth Championship in Paraguay, and he played for Alianza Lima, Deportivo Aviación, Sport Boys and currently plays for Deportivo Coopsol.

Honours
Real Garcilaso
Copa Perú: 2011

References

External links

1987 births
Living people
Association football defenders
Peruvian footballers
Peruvian Segunda División players
Club Alianza Lima footballers
Real Garcilaso footballers
Peruvian Primera División players
Copa Perú players
Deportivo Binacional FC players